FC Cincinnati 2 is an American professional soccer team based in Cincinnati, Ohio, United States. It is the reserve team of FC Cincinnati and participates in MLS Next Pro.

History 
On December 6, 2021, FC Cincinnati were named as one of 21 clubs that would field a team in the new MLS Next Pro league beginning in the 2022 season. On February 22, 2022, FC Cincinnati unveiled the name and coaching staff of the new team.

Stadium 
On February 24, 2022, the team announced that for their inaugural season, they would use three different venues as their home stadium. Their first seven home matches would be played at NKU Soccer Stadium, a 1,000-capacity venue at Northern Kentucky University in Highland Heights, Kentucky. Four of their remaining five matches would be played at Mercy Health Training Center, the team's training facility in Milford, Ohio which includes a 500-capacity stadium. One match would be played at TQL Stadium, the first team's 26,000-capacity home venue in Cincinnati, Ohio.

Players and staff

Roster

Staff 
 Tyrone Marshall – Head coach
 Shavar Thomas – Assistant coach
 Ryan Coulter – Goalkeepers coach

Team records

Year-by-Year

Head coaches record

See also 
 MLS Next Pro

References

External links 
 

Association football clubs established in 2021
2021 establishments in Ohio
FC Cincinnati
Soccer clubs in Ohio
Reserve soccer teams in the United States
MLS Next Pro teams